Carol Ann Carter is an American artist best known for her mixed media and fiber construction works.  Her works can be found in public collections such as the Indianapolis Museum of Art. She is currently a Professor Emeritus of visual arts at the University of Kansas.

Background 
Carol Ann Carter earned her Bachelor of Fine Arts from the Herron School of Art at the Indiana University in 1970. After completing her Bachelor's she was taken on as artist-in-residence at her alma mater, Shortridge High School in Indianapolis. The program was funded by the PTA Fine Arts Committee and the Indiana State Arts Commission and was meant to inspire artistic expression and confidence in students who were not already interested in the arts. Carter then completed her Masters of Fine Arts from the University of Notre Dame in 1974.

Art influence and style 
In her early years, Carter was focused on intaglio printmaking and then transitioned into textile work in 1984 after she traveled to Nigeria on a Lilly Endowment to study traditional men's embroidery and weaving. This trip solidified her interest in examining culture and gender through textile work. Carter's recent works are multimedia, digital and video based.

Selected awards 
 National Endowment Individual Artists Award
 Lilly Foundation Open Faculty Fellowship for Sabbatical research
 Ford Foundation Postdoctoral for Minorities Fellowship
 J.W. Fulbright Fellowship for research
 Kansas Arts Commission Individual Artist Fellowship

References 

University of Kansas faculty
Herron School of Art and Design alumni
Notre Dame College of Arts and Letters alumni
American women artists
1947 births
Artists from Indianapolis
Living people
American women academics
21st-century American women